The Chaotic Wrestling (CW) New England Championship is a professional wrestling title in American independent promotion Chaotic Wrestling. The title was first won by "Latin Fury" Luis Ortiz in Revere, Massachusetts on February 23, 2001. There have been a total of 40 recognized individual champions, who have had a combined 60 official reigns.

Title history

Combined reigns

See also
Chaotic Wrestling Heavyweight Championship
Chaotic Wrestling Tag Team Championship
Chaotic Wrestling Pan Optic Championship

References

External links
 CW New England Championship

Chaotic Wrestling championships
Heavyweight wrestling championships
United States regional professional wrestling championships